North Easton station is a former railroad station designed by noted American architect H. H. Richardson. It is located just off Oliver Street in North Easton, Massachusetts, and currently houses the Easton Historical Society. The station was built in 1881 and served commuter trains until 1958. It was added to the National Register of Historic Places in 1972 as Old Colony Railroad Station. In 1987, it also became part of the H. H. Richardson Historic District of North Easton, a National Historic Landmark District. The proposed Phase 2 of South Coast Rail would return commuter rail service to the location in 2030 as Easton Village station.

History

The Easton Branch Railroad opened from Stoughton to North Easton on May 16, 1855. Originally part of the Boston and Providence Railroad, it became part of the Dighton and Somerset Railroad in 1866.

A new station was commissioned in 1881 by Frederick Lothrop Ames, director of the Old Colony Railroad, during the same year that Richardson designed the Ames Gate Lodge for his nearby estate. Frederick Law Olmsted landscaped its grounds. It is a relatively small station, a single story in height with Richardson's characteristic heavy masonry and outsized roof. Its long axis runs north-south with the tracks, now disused, along its west side. The building is laid out symmetrically within, with a large passenger room at each end (one for women, the other for men).

The station's facade is constructed of rough-faced, random ashlar of gray granite with a brownstone belt course and trim. Two large, semicircular arches punctuate each of the long facades, inset with windows and doorways, and ornamented with carvings of a beast's snarling head; a further semicircular arch projects to form the east facade's porte-cochere. Eaves project deeply over all sides, supported by plain wooden brackets.

Commuter rail service past Stoughton was cut on September 5, 1958. In 1969, the Ames family purchased the property from the Penn Central Railroad and gave it to the historical society. It was added to the National Register of Historic Places in 1972. In 1987, it also became part of the H. H. Richardson Historic District of North Easton, a National Historic Landmark District.

A new MBTA Commuter Rail station, Easton Village, is proposed to be built at the site as part of the South Coast Rail project.

See also
Ames Shovel Shop
H. H. Richardson Historic District of North Easton
North Easton Historic District
National Register of Historic Places listings in Bristol County, Massachusetts
List of Old Colony Railroad stations

References

External links

Easton Historical Society

Richardsonian Romanesque architecture in Massachusetts
Henry Hobson Richardson buildings
Railway stations in the United States opened in 1855
Railway stations on the National Register of Historic Places in Massachusetts
Historic American Buildings Survey in Massachusetts
Buildings and structures in Bristol County, Massachusetts
Stations along Old Colony Railroad lines
Easton, Massachusetts
National Register of Historic Places in Bristol County, Massachusetts
Former railway stations in Massachusetts
Historic district contributing properties in Massachusetts
1855 establishments in Massachusetts
MBTA Commuter Rail stations in Bristol County, Massachusetts
Railway stations closed in 1958
Railway stations scheduled to open in 2030
Proposed MBTA Commuter Rail stations